Valeria Bilello (born 2 May 1982) is an Italian actress and model.

Biography 
Valeria Bilello was born in Sciacca, in Sicily, Italy, on 2 May 1982, and grew up in Milan. During her high-school studies in foreign languages, she made her debut in the showbiz starting to model and shooting commercials.
After her film studies in Milan, in 2006 she shot the short film Attesa, winner at the Festival Sguardi Altrove. In 2008 she started her career as an actress, playing in the movie Giovanna's Father, directed by Pupi Avati and presented at the Venice Film Festival. In 2010, Academy Award winner Gabriele Salvatores chose her for the movie Happy Family, for which she was awarded as best actress at the Festival International du film de Boulogne-Billancourt. Between 2011 and 2012 she played different roles: in Il giorno in più by Massimo Venier, in I soliti idioti by Enrico Lando, in Ti amo troppo per dirtelo by Marco Ponti and in Come non detto by Ivan Silvestrini. In 2013 she played in Pazze di me by Fausto Brizzi, in Miele by Valeria Golino and she was the only Italian actress in One Chance by David Frankel. In 2014 she will be on the screen in the movie Io, Arlecchino by Giorgio Pasotti.

In 2012 Giorgio Armani wanted her to be the worldwide testimonial of the fragrance Armani Code Luna commercial and print campaign. The campaign led to the creation of a trilogy of short movies (Olga, Alice and Valeria), directed by Olivier Zahm, Can Evgin and Julien Carlier and in collaboration with the magazine Purple.

Filmography

Films

Television

Music videos

Non-scripted television shows

MTV
 Web Chart (1999–2000)
 Hitlist Italia 
 Dancefloor Chart 
 Romalive (2000–2001)
 MTV Select (2002–2004)
 MTV on the beach (2001, 2003–2004)
 Dance Show (2004–2005)

All Music 
 Call Center (2006)
 One Shot Revolution (2006-2009)
 All Music Show (2006)
 Playlist
 Community (2008)
 On Live (2008)

Mediaset 
 Nonsolomoda, Canale 5 (2010-2011)

Advertisement 
Telecom Italia – Telecom Italia Mobile (2003)
Giorgio Armani – Olga, directed by Olivier Zahm and Can Evgin (2011)
Giorgio Armani – Alice, directed by Olivier Zahm and Can Evgin (2012)
Giorgio Armani – Valeria, directed by Olivier Zahm and Julien Carlier (2012)
Giorgio Armani – Armani Code Luna (2012)

Videoclip 
Pier Cortese – Dimmi come passi le notti, directed by Jacopo Tartarone (2006)
Mambassa – Melancholia, directed by Lorenzo Vignolo (2015)

Awards 
2006: Best Directing Award at the Festival Sguardi Altrove for the short film Attesa.
2010: Best Actress Award at the Festival International du film de Boulogne-Billancourt for the film Happy Family directed by Gabriele Salvatores.
2015: L'Oréal Paris for Cinema Award at Venice Film Festival.

References

External links 
 Official Facebook page
 
 Tavistock Wood Agency
 TNA Agency
 WhyNotModels Agency

1982 births
Living people
People from Sciacca
Italian female models
Italian film actresses
Italian stage actresses
Italian television actresses
Italian television presenters
Actors from Sicily
VJs (media personalities)
Italian women television presenters
Models from Sicily